Oligodon theobaldi, commonly known as the Mandalay kukri snake or Theobald's kukri snake, is a species of snake in the family Colubridae. The species is endemic to Asia.

Etymology
The specific name, theobaldi, is in honor of British herpetologist William Theobald.

Geographic range
O. theobaldi is found in Bangladesh, India (Assam), Myanmar (formerly called Burma), and Thailand.

Habitat

Description
Its coloration resembles that of a garter snake.

Reproduction
O. theobaldi is oviparous.

References

Further reading
Boulenger GA (1890). The Fauna of British India, Including Ceylon and Burma. Reptilia and Batrachia. London: Secretary of State for India in Council. (Taylor and Francis, printers). xviii + 541 pp. (Simotes theobaldi, p. 315).
Boulenger GA (1894). Catalogue of the Snakes in the British Museum (Natural History). Volume II., Containing the Conclusion of the Colubridæ Aglyphæ. London: Trustees of the British Museum (Natural History). (Taylor and Francis, printers). xi + 382 pp. + Plates I-XX. (Simotes theobaldi, pp. 230–231 + Plate IX, figure 3).
Das I (2002). A Photographic Guide to Snakes and other Reptiles of India. Sanibel Island, Florida: Ralph Curtis Books. 144 pp. . (Oligodon theobaldi, p. 41).
Green, Marc D.; Orlov, Nikolai L.; Murphy, Robert W. (2010). "Toward a Phylogeny of the Kukri Snakes, Genus Oligodon ". Asian Herpetological Research 2 (1): 1-21.
Günther A (1868). "Sixth Account of new Species of Snakes in the Collection of the British Museum". Annals and Magazine of Natural History, Fourth Series 1: 413–429. (Simotes theobaldi, new species, p. 417).
Smith MA (1943). The Fauna of British India, Ceylon and Burma, Including the Whole of the Indo-Chinese Sub-region. Reptilia and Amphibia. Vol. III.—Serpentes. London: Secretary of State for India. (Taylor and Francis, printers). xii + 583 pp. (Oligodon theobaldi, p. 220, Figure 74).

External links
A Database of Indigenous Snake Species of Bangladesh (ISOB). http://www.snakebd.com/snakeProfile.php

theobaldi
Reptiles of Thailand
Reptiles described in 1868
Taxa named by Albert Günther